King Davids Peak, also known as the West Wall, is a mountain in the Central Highlands region of Tasmania, Australia. The mountain is situated in the Walls of Jerusalem National Park.

Like other features of the park, such as Herods Gate, Lake Salome, Solomons Jewels, Damascus Gate, the Pool of Bathesda, many features are named for places and people in the Bible. The mountain is named after the biblical ruler of Judea, King David. Its alternative name – The West Wall – is named after the West Wall in Jerusalem.

King Davids Peak is the most prominent feature of the national park, and is a popular venue with bushwalkers and mountain climbers.

See also

 List of highest mountains of Tasmania

References

External links
 Parks Tasmania

Mountains of Tasmania
Central Highlands (Tasmania)
Walls of Jerusalem National Park